Joseph Dickenson was an English footballer. He made his Football League debut in 1892 for Bolton Wanderers and went on to make 42 league appearances for the club, scoring 11 goals. He also appeared for the club in the 1894 FA Cup Final. In 1894 he moved to New Brompton and made 11 appearances in the club's first season in the Southern Football League. After spells playing for Chatham and Grays United he returned to New Brompton in 1903 and made a further two appearances.

References

Year of birth missing
Year of death missing
Sportspeople from Chatham, Kent
Footballers from Kent
English footballers
Gillingham F.C. players
Bolton Wanderers F.C. players
Association football midfielders
FA Cup Final players